Dawn Millicent Scott (born October 1973) is head of life sciences at Keele University since 2019. She has researched the lives of urban foxes.

References

External links 

https://www.youtube.com/watch?v=TQO2iDcRz9Y&list=

1973 births
Living people
Academics of Keele University
Alumni of Durham University
Academics of the University of Brighton
English conservationists
Women conservationists
Women naturalists
English women scientists